Edward "Ted" Chapelhow (born 21 September 1995) is an English professional rugby league footballer who plays as a prop for the Newcastle Thunder in the Betfred Championship.

Background
Ted Chapelhow was born in Runcorn, Cheshire, England. His twin brother Jay Chapelhow also plays for Newcastle Thunder in the Betfred Championship.

Career

Widnes Vikings
Chapelhow is a graduate of the Widnes Vikings Academy system and played his junior rugby league for the West Bank Bears club. He has represented England at youth team level.

In 2015 he made his professional début for Whitehaven in the Kingstone Press Championship.

He has since returned to Whitehaven in the Kingstone Press Championship as a dual-registered player.

Ottawa Aces
On 10 Aug 2020 it was announced that Ted, along with his twin brother Jay, had signed for Ottawa Aces

Newcastle Thunder
Due to Ottawa Aces' deferred competition start date, Chapelhow, again with his twin brother, both instead signed up for Newcastle Thunder on 24 Dec 2020

References

External links
Widnes Vikings profile
SL profile

1995 births
Living people
Bradford Bulls players
English rugby league players
Newcastle Thunder players
North Wales Crusaders players
Rugby league players from Widnes
Rugby league props
Widnes Vikings players
Whitehaven R.L.F.C. players